The 1994 New Hampshire gubernatorial election took place on November 8, 1994. Incumbent Governor Steve Merrill won re-election.

Merrill chose not to seek a third term in 1996, and following this election, the Democrats would control the governorship for 18 of the next 20 years.

Election results

References

See also

New Hampshire
1994
Gubernatorial